Grewia asiatica, commonly known as phalsa or falsa, is a species of flowering plant in the mallow family Malvaceae. It was first found in Varanasi, India, and was taken by Buddhist scholars to other Asian countries and the rest of the world. Grewia celtidifolia was initially considered a mere variety of phalsa, but is now recognized as a distinct species.

It is a shrub or small tree growing to 8 m tall. The leaves are broadly rounded, 5–18 cm long and broad, with a petiole 1–1.5 cm long. The flowers are produced in cymes of several together, the individual flowers about 2 cm diameter, yellow, with five large (12 mm) sepals and five smaller (4–5 mm) petals. The fruit is an edible drupe 5–12 mm diameter, purple to black when ripe.

Cultivation and uses
It is extensively cultivated for its sweet and sour acidic fruit, which are sold in the market during summer months under the name falsa. The Sharbat or squash is prepared from the fruit pulp by mixing it with sugar and used as an astringent, stomachic and cooling agent.

The root is used by Santhal tribals for rheumatisms. The stem bark is said to be used in refining sugar, for making ropes and its infusion is used as a demulcent. The leaves are used as an application to pustular eruptions. The buds are also prescribed by some physicians.

It has become naturalised and locally invasive in Australia and the Philippines.

References

asiatica
Flora of tropical Asia
Plants described in 1767